Placida dendritica is a species of minute sea slug, a marine opisthobranch gastropod mollusk or micromollusk in the family Limapontiidae.

Despite a superficial resemblance, this is not a nudibranch, it is a sacoglossan (i.e. it is in the order Sacoglossa).

Like most sacoglossans, Placida dendritica feeds on coenocytic green algae. It is able to retain the chloroplasts for a short period.

Distribution
This species has been reported worldwide, but it is most likely a species complex.

References

 Powell A. W. B., New Zealand Mollusca, William Collins Publishers Ltd, Auckland, New Zealand 1979 
 de Kluijver, M.J.; Ingalsuo, S.S.; de Bruyne, R.H. (2000). Macrobenthos of the North Sea [CD-ROM]: 1. Keys to Mollusca and Brachiopoda. World Biodiversity Database CD-ROM Series. Expert Center for Taxonomic Identification (ETI): Amsterdam, The Netherlands. 
 Bleakney, J.S. 1996. Sea slugs of Atlantic Canada and the Gulf of Maine. The Nova Scotia Museum Field Guide Series. Nimbus Publishing. Halifax. 216 p. 
 Gofas, S.; Le Renard, J.; Bouchet, P. (2001). Mollusca, in: Costello, M.J. et al. (Ed.) (2001). European register of marine species: a check-list of the marine species in Europe and a bibliography of guides to their identification. Collection Patrimoines Naturels, 50: pp. 180–213
 Willan, R. (2009). Opisthobranchia (Mollusca). In: Gordon, D. (Ed.) (2009). New Zealand Inventory of Biodiversity. Volume One: Kingdom Animalia. 584 pp

External links
 
 Sea Slug Forum

Limapontiidae
Gastropods described in 1843